Nada Martinović (born August 11, 1967) is a Serbian and American music educator, conductor and researcher from Cleveland, Ohio.

Early life and education 
Martinović completed primary and secondary education in Šabac, Serbia at the same time primary and secondary music school, named after the composer and conductor Mihailo Vukdragović. She continued her education at the University of Arts in Belgrade Faculty of Music Arts, majoring in Music Pedagogy and obtaining the title of music professor.

Career 
After graduating, she returned to Šabac and worked as a professor of piano and solfeggio. A year later, she revived the work of the kindergarten music class, while at the same time, she coached her high school students and won the first place in the competition of the "Muzička omladina" youth organization. During the Yugoslav Wars, in collaboration with four other colleagues, she opened the first private music school in Šabac.

After emigrating to the United States in 1997, Martinović continued her education, receiving a master's degree in music pedagogy and early childhood development from Cleveland State University (2001), and earning a Doctor of Philosophy degree at Kent State University in Kent (2010) by researching the connection between movement, memory and musical cognition. She has presented the results of her scientific work at many conferences, including the International Society for Music Education meetings in Copenhagen and in Porto Alegre and Brasília. She also contributed to the National Children's Study, working on the analysis of the impact of the environmental factors on the health of young children.

Martinović was the owner, publisher, and chief operating officer of The Women's Journal publication. She worked as a partnership expert for the United States Department of Commerce. She is a professor of music at the Kent State University, director of the Cleveland Serbian Film Festival and founder and manager of the nonprofit organization Serbian Heritage Project, which she founded in 2014 in cooperation with the Western Reserve Historical Society to create an archive of the Serbian population in Northeastern Ohio.

Since 2013, Martinović has been representing Serbian community at Cleveland International Community Day at the Cleveland Museum of Art. She is also a founding board member and Serbian representative in the Eastern European Congress of Ohio, board member and past Vice President of the International Community Council – Worldwide Intercultural Network (ICC-WIN), member of Global Cleveland and the Ohio representative of the Tesla Science Foundation from Philadelphia. She teaches music and the Serbian language at the Serbian Sunday school and she is the conductor of St. Sava Children's Choir and since 2018 the conductor of the Serbian Men's Choir "Kosovo" from Cleveland as well. In 2019, she was entrusted with the position of coordinator and artistic director in the Serbian Cultural Garden during the One World Day festival. Martinović is the author of numerous exhibitions, lectures and cultural events.

St. Sava Children's Choir 
Martinović founded the St. Sava Children's Choir in 2002, with the aim to introduce, practice, and perpetuate Serbian culture, language and tradition. Children from Serbian churches in Cleveland, who are mostly American born, sing in it and learn the language of their ancestors through singing. The choir performed at Kent State University in 2014 and 2016; Cleveland Museum of Art in 2014, 2015 and 2019; Cuyahoga Community College in 2015; and they marked the 70th anniversary of the One World Day festival in 2015 in the Serbian Cultural Garden with an original "Children Musicking" performance. The following year, 2016, the choir recorded its first song "Flowers from Cleveland Garden," which is enriched with a video and became the choir's anthem.

In honor of the 164th anniversary of the birth of Nikola Tesla, as part of the project "Children of Serbia," which was organized by the Association of Music Teachers of Serbia and supported by the Directorate for Cooperation with the Diaspora and Serbs in the Region, St. Sava Children's Choir collaborated with Leontina Vukomanović's Choir "Čarolija", Folklore Group "Morava" from Cleveland and the Serbian School "Nikola Tesla" from Niagara Falls and recorded the song and video "The Circuit" (2020).

Bibliography 

 Parents' and Teachers' Perceptions of the Musical Development of Preschool Children Ages Two Through Four, scientific study (Cleveland State University, Cleveland, OH, 2001)
 The Effect of Movement Instruction on Memorization and Retention of New-Song Material Among First-Grade Students, scientific study (Kent State University, Kent, OH, 2010)

References 

1967 births
People from Šabac
People from Cleveland
Serbian emigrants to the United States
Serbian conductors (music)
American conductors (music)
Serbian scientists
American scientists
Living people